Tyneside was a parliamentary constituency in the Tyneside area of north-east England, which returned one Member of Parliament (MP) to the House of Commons of the Parliament of the United Kingdom, elected by the first-past-the-post voting system.

The constituency was created by the Redistribution of Seats Act 1885 for the 1885 general election as one of four single-member Divisions of the county of Northumberland, and abolished for the 1918 general election.

Boundaries
The contents of the county division, as defined by the Redistribution of Seats Act 1885, were:The Sessional Division of Castle West (part), the Municipal Boroughs of Newcastle-upon-Tyne, and Tynemouth, and the Parish of Wallsend.NB included non-resident freeholders in the parliamentary boroughs of Newcastle upon Tyne and Tynemouth.

Abolition 
On abolition in 1918, the contents of the seat were distributed as follows:

 the majority of the electorate, comprising the municipal borough of Wallsend and the urban districts of Gosforth, Longbenton and Weetslade formed the new Parliamentary Borough of Wallsend;
 the former urban districts of Walker, and Benwell and Fenham which had been abolished in 1904 and absorbed into the County Borough of Newcastle upon Tyne were included in Newcastle upon Tyne East and West respectively; and
 the urban district of Newburn and surrounding rural areas were transferred to Wansbeck.

Members of Parliament

Elections

Elections in the 1880s

Elections in the 1890s

Elections in the 1900s

Elections in the 1910s 

General Election 1914–15:

Another General Election was required to take place before the end of 1915. The political parties had been making preparations for an election to take place and by the July 1914, the following candidates had been selected; 
Liberal: J. M. Robertson
Unionist:

See also 

 History of parliamentary constituencies and boundaries in Northumberland

References 

Parliamentary constituencies in Tyne and Wear (historic)
Parliamentary constituencies in Northumberland (historic)
Constituencies of the Parliament of the United Kingdom established in 1885
Constituencies of the Parliament of the United Kingdom disestablished in 1918